This article contains information, results and statistics regarding the Australian national cricket team in the 2007–08 season. Statisticians class the 2007–08 season as those matches played on tours that started between September 2007 and April 2008.

Player contracts

The 2007–08 list of contracted players was announced on 1 May 2007. Note that uncontracted players still are available for selection for the national cricket team.

Match summary

M = Matches Played, W = Won, L = Lost, D = Drawn, T = Tied, NR = No Result
Last updated 8 March 2008

Tournament Summary

 Australia made the semi-final stage of the 2007 Twenty20 World Championship
 Australia won the Future Cup ODI series against India 4–2
 Australia won the Warne–Muralitharan Trophy against Sri Lanka 2–0
 Australia won the Chappell–Hadlee Trophy against New Zealand 2–0
 Australia won the Border-Gavaskar Trophy against India 2–1
 Australia lost the Commonwealth Bank Series finals against India 2–0

Twenty20 World Championship

Australia's 2007–08 season began with the 2007 Twenty20 World Championship in South Africa. Australia were placed in Group B and their first official match saw them take on Zimbabwe on 12 September 2007 in Cape Town.

To prepare for the tournament, Australia played two warm-up games against New Zealand and South Africa.

Unofficial Warm-Up: v New Zealand, 8 September, Benoni

Australia were sent in to bowl by New Zealand and early wickets by Ben Hilfenhaus and Brett Lee restricted New Zealand to 4/61 off 9.2 overs. Despite this, a strong partnership of 67 between Ross Taylor and Craig McMillan saw the Kiwis claw their way back. Nathan Bracken claimed the vital wicket of Taylor for 53 and Mitchell Johnson dismissed McMillan for 60 on the last ball of the innings restricting New Zealand to a chaseable 182. Hilfenhaus was the pick of the bowlers for Australia, taking 3/11 off his 3 overs. Nathan Bracken also played a vital role taking 2/34 off his 4 overs.

Australia's innings began poorly with Shane Bond taking the wickets of Adam Gilchrist and Matthew Hayden within 4 deliveries. Brad Hodge was dismissed in the second over leaving Australia reeling at 3–15. A very strong partnership between Andrew Symonds and Michael Hussey rescued Australia, as they put on 113 for the fourth wicket. Despite their dismissals, this partnership was enough to see Australia cruise to victory with ten balls to spare. Hussey top scored for Australia scoring 72 off 44 balls, however Symonds was not far behind scoring 70 off 43 balls.

Unofficial Warm-Up: v South Africa, 9 September, Centurion

Australia were sent in to bat by South Africa and were on the back foot early. In the third over of Australia's innings, Adam Gilchrist and Brad Haddin fell in successive balls to South African pace-bowler Shaun Pollock. Brad Hodge fell in the fourth and Australia were in trouble at 3/21 after 3.4 overs. Just as he did in the warm-up against New Zealand, Andrew Symonds steadied the ship scoring a strong 45 off 26 balls. Despite Symonds' resistance, South Africa continued to steadily take wickets, and only a late flurry of powerful hitting by tailender Mitchell Johnson propelled Australia to a healthy target of 8/179.

South Africa's innings got off to a flying start, and despite Ben Hilfenhaus continuing his good warm-up form by dismissing Herschelle Gibbs in the 6th over for 20, Graeme Smith and AB de Villiers put on a partnership of 116 runs which helped guide South Africa to an easy 8 wicket victory.

Group B: v Zimbabwe, 12 September, Cape Town

Twenty20 International Debuts: Mitchell Johnson, Brad Hodge

Australia got their new season off to a poor start, losing their first official match to Zimbabwe. After winning the toss and electing to bat, Australia were off to a shaky start as some tight and effective Zimbabwean bowling had them at 3/19 off 4 overs. Things never really picked up for the Australian batsmen, who appeared to be suffering from a lack of match practice. In slow conditions Brad Hodge did his best to attempt to steer the innings in the right direction, scoring 35 off 22. However regular wickets falling at the other end meant that Australia were restricted to 138 off their 20 overs.

Brendan Taylor was the hero for Zimbabwe, as he remained not out on 60 to see the Zimbabweans home to a memorable victory with only one ball remaining. It was a severe wake up call for a quite complacent Australia and in the post-match interview, captain Ricky Ponting explained that Australia have "got to start respecting [Twenty20] now".

Group B: v England, 14 September, Cape Town

After their shock loss to Zimbabwe, Australia needed to beat England in order to progress through to the Super 8 stage of the tournament. England won the toss and their captain Paul Collingwood sent Australia in to field. The Australians put in a very disciplined performance with the ball, taking wickets at regular intervals and keeping the run rate low throughout the innings. Nathan Bracken and Mitchell Johnson each took 3 wickets, while Stuart Clark and Brett Lee took 2 and 1 respectively. Several of England's batsmen got starts, however failed to convert them with their top scorer being Andrew Flintoff, reaching 31.

Australia cruised to victory on the back of a 79 run opening partnership between Matthew Hayden and Adam Gilchrist. They reached the target within 15 overs and therefore successfully progressed to the Super 8 stage of the tournament.

Australia finished first in Group B based upon net run-rate, and were placed in Group F for the Super 8 stage.

Group F: v Bangladesh, 16 September, Cape Town

Australia's Super 8's campaign got off to an excellent start as they defeated Bangladesh comfortably in Cape Town. After winning the toss, Australian captain Ricky Ponting elected to field first. Australia bowled excellently, tying down the Bangladeshi batsmen, and only allowing them to score at 6 an over. Brett Lee took the first international Twenty20 hat-trick during this innings and finished with figures of 3/27. Bangladesh's innings never gained momentum and Australia restricted them to 123 off 20 overs.

Adam Gilchrist and Matthew Hayden put on their first Twenty20 century partnership to help the Australians chase down the target of 124 comfortably with over 6 overs to spare.

Group F: v Pakistan, 18 September, Johannesburg

Australia's second Super 8's game was not as successful as their first. Sent in to bat, Australia struggled to find any momentum. While many Australian batsmen got starts, tight Pakistan bowling restricted their scoring chances. Michael Hussey top scored for Australia with 37, and at one point a total of 180 plus even looked possible for Australia. Effective bowling at the death however, restricted Australia to 7/164 off their 20 overs. During this innings, Australian captain Ricky Ponting received a hamstring strain and was ruled out of action for between two and four weeks.

Pakistan's top order had struggled throughout the tournament, and this continued in their innings. Stuart Clark took 3 quick wickets to have Pakistan 4/46 after 6.4 overs. Despite this, an excellent 100 run partnership between Pakistan captain Shoaib Malik and Misbah-ul-Haq rescued Pakistan and guided them home with 5 balls to spare. This loss meant that Australia had to win their next Super 8's match against Sri Lanka in order to progress to the semi-finals.

Group F: v Sri Lanka, 20 September, Cape Town

With the winner of this match going through to the semi-finals, it was virtually a knockout. Australia won the toss and stand in captain Adam Gilchrist elected to bowl first. This decision was justified as Australia demolished Sri Lanka's top order, having them 7/43 down after 10 overs. While Jehan Mubarak resisted, Sri Lanka were dismissed for a meagre 101 and needed a minor miracle to escape with a victory. Stuart Clark was the pick of the Australian bowlers taking 4/20, the best ever figures by an Australian in Twenty20 Internationals.

Openers Adam Gilchrist and Matthew Hayden once again got the Australians off to a magnificent start, and guided them to a very comfortable 10 wicket victory, the first in the Twenty20 World Championship. As a result of this match, Australia finished second in Group F, and therefore qualified for the semi-finals where they would meet India.

Semi-final: v India, 22 September, Durban

The semi-final stage of the 2007 Twenty20 World Championship saw Australia knocked out by eventual winners India. The Indians won the toss and elected to bat, and after a steady start, an explosive innings by Yuvraj Singh coupled with a quickfire 36 by MS Dhoni saw the Indians reach a strong total of 188 from 20 overs on a batsman friendly Durban pitch. Mitchell Johnson was Australia's best bowler taking 2 wickets in his 4 over spell.

Facing a difficult task to progress to the final, Australia seemed on target to reach India's total after Matthew Hayden once again top scored for the Australians with 62 off 47 balls. It was in the later overs that Australia's chase was dismantled, as the wicket of Andrew Symonds seemed to give the Indians momentum. Australia managed 173 off their 20 overs, and thus India won by 15 runs and knocked Australia out of the tournament.

Tour of India

On 26 September, Australia arrived in India for a 7 game One Day International series, contesting the Future Cup. The first game of the series was played on 29 September 2007, and the tour concluded with a one off Twenty20 International on 20 October 2007.

First ODI: 29 September, Bangalore

Series was level at 0–0

Second ODI: 2 October, Kochi

Australia led the series 1–0

Third ODI: 5 October, Hyderabad

Australia led the series 2–0

Fourth ODI: 8 October, Chandigarh

Australia led the series 2–1

Fifth ODI: 11 October, Vadodara

Australia led the series 3–1

Sixth ODI: 14 October, Nagpur

Australia led the series 4–1

Seventh ODI: 17 October, Mumbai

Australia won the series 4–2

Man of the Series: Andrew Symonds

Twenty20 International: 20 October, Mumbai

Sri Lanka in Australia

Sri Lanka travelled to Australia for a two-match Test series contesting the Warne–Muralitharan Trophy in
November. The first Test began in Brisbane on 8 November. On 1 November, a 13-man squad was named by the Australian selectors for the first Test. Phil Jaques was named as a replacement for the retiring Justin Langer while Brad Hogg and Stuart MacGill were selected in place of the retiring Shane Warne. Mitchell Johnson and Shaun Tait were also named in the squad, however Tait pulled out due to an elbow injury and was replaced by Ben Hilfenhaus.

Australia won the inaugural Warne–Muralitharan Trophy 2–0, with Brett Lee winning Man of the Series.

First Test: 8–12 November, Brisbane

Australian XI: Phil Jaques, Matthew Hayden, Ricky Ponting (c), Michael Hussey, Michael Clarke, Andrew Symonds, Adam Gilchrist (wk), Brett Lee, Mitchell Johnson, Stuart Clark, Stuart MacGill

Test Debut: Mitchell Johnson

Australia led the series 1–0

Second Test: 16–20 November, Hobart

Australian XI: Phil Jaques, Matthew Hayden, Ricky Ponting (c), Michael Hussey, Michael Clarke, Andrew Symonds, Adam Gilchrist (wk), Brett Lee, Mitchell Johnson, Stuart Clark, Stuart MacGill

Australia won the series 2–0

Man of the Series: Brett Lee

New Zealand in Australia

New Zealand travelled to Australia in December for a one-off Twenty20 International and the three-match Chappell–Hadlee Trophy.

Twenty20 International: 11 December, Perth

Twenty20 International Debuts: Luke Pomersbach, Ashley Noffke, Adam Voges, Shaun Tait

First ODI: 14 December, Adelaide

Australia led the series 1–0

Second ODI: 16 December, Sydney

Australia led the series 1–0

Third ODI: 20 December, Hobart

Australia won the series 2–0

Man of the Series: Ricky Ponting

India in Australia

India arrived in Australia in December for a four match test series as well as a one off Twenty20 International and the Commonwealth Bank Series.

First Test: 26–30 December, Melbourne

Australian XI: Phil Jaques, Matthew Hayden, Ricky Ponting (c), Michael Hussey, Michael Clarke, Andrew Symonds, Adam Gilchrist (wk), Brett Lee, Brad Hogg, Mitchell Johnson, Stuart Clark

Australia lead the series 1–0

Second Test: 2–6 January, Sydney

Australian XI: Phil Jaques, Matthew Hayden, Ricky Ponting (c), Michael Hussey, Michael Clarke, Andrew Symonds, Adam Gilchrist (wk), Brett Lee, Brad Hogg, Mitchell Johnson, Stuart Clark

Australia led the series 2–0

Third Test: 16–19 January, Perth

Australian XI: Phil Jaques, Chris Rogers, Ricky Ponting (c), Michael Hussey, Michael Clarke, Andrew Symonds, Adam Gilchrist (wk), Brett Lee, Mitchell Johnson, Stuart Clark, Shaun Tait

Test debut: Chris Rogers

Australia led the series 2–1

Fourth Test: 24–28 January, Adelaide

Australian XI: Phil Jaques, Matthew Hayden, Ricky Ponting (c), Michael Hussey, Michael Clarke, Andrew Symonds, Adam Gilchrist (wk), Brett Lee, Brad Hogg, Mitchell Johnson, Stuart Clark

Australia won the series 2–1

Man of the Series: Brett Lee

Twenty20 International: 1 February, Melbourne

Twenty20 International Debut: David Hussey

Commonwealth Bank Series

The Commonwealth Bank One Day International series will take place throughout February with the finals series being held in March. This season Australia will take on Sri Lanka and India.

Match One: 3 February, Brisbane

One Day International debut: Ashley Noffke

Match Three: 8 February, Sydney

Match Four: 10 February, Melbourne

Match Six: 15 February, Perth

Match Seven: 17 February, Adelaide

Match Nine: 22 February, Melbourne

Match Ten: 24 February, Sydney

Match Twelve: 29 February, Melbourne

Final One: 2 March, Sydney

Final Two: 4 March, Brisbane

India won the Commonwealth Bank Series finals 2–0

Man of the Series: Nathan Bracken

Tour of Pakistan

Australia were scheduled do play Tests and One Day Internationals in Pakistan in March and April 2008, however Cricket Australia postponed the tour due to security concerns. The tour will now be played in 2009 and 2010.

Statistics

Matches Played

The following is a table of statistics charting appearances by Australian cricketers in the 2007–08 season. The minimum requirement for inclusion is one match played. The players will be arranged in alphabetical order.

Last updated 8 March 2008

Batting

Twenty20 Internationals

The following is a table of statistics charting Australian batsmen in Twenty20 International cricket in the 2007–08 season. The minimum requirement for inclusion is one innings played. The players will be arranged by most runs scored.

Last updated 5 February 2007

One Day Internationals
The following is a table of statistics charting Australian batsmen in One Day International cricket in the 2007–08 season. The minimum requirement for inclusion is one innings played. The players will be arranged by most runs scored.

Last updated 28 March 2008

Tests

The following is a table of statistics charting Australian batsmen in Test cricket in the 2007–08 season. The minimum requirement for inclusion is one innings played. The players will be arranged by most runs scored.

Last updated 29 January 2008

 Mts = Matches, Inns = Innings, NO = Not Outs, BF = Balls Faced, Avg = Batting Average, S/R = Batting Strike Rate, HS = Highest Score

Bowling

Twenty20 Internationals

The following is a table of statistics charting Australian bowlers in Twenty20 International cricket in the 2007–08 season. The minimum requirement for inclusion is one ball bowled. The players will be arranged by most wickets taken.

Last updated 5 February 2008

One Day Internationals
The following is a table of statistics charting Australian bowlers in One Day International cricket in the 2007–08 season. The minimum requirement for inclusion is one ball bowled. The players will be arranged by most wickets taken.

Last updated 28 March 2008

Tests

The following is a table of statistics charting Australian bowlers in Test cricket in the 2007–08 season. The minimum requirement for inclusion is one ball bowled. The players will be arranged by most wickets taken.

Mts = Matches, Wkts = Wickets, Runs = Runs scored off bowler, Avg = Bowling Average, S/R = Bowling Strike Rate, BBI = Best Bowling Innings, Econ = Economy Rate, BBM = Best Bowling Match, Ovrs = Overs Bowled, 5WI = 5 Wickets Innings, 10WM = 10 Wickets Match

Catches

The following is a table of statistics charting catches taken by Australian fieldsmen in the 2007–08 season. The minimum requirement for inclusion is one catch. The players will be arranged in alphabetical order.

† Wicketkeeper 
Last updated 28 March 2008

Important events

 In the 2007 Twenty20 World Championship, Brett Lee became the first bowler to take a hat-trick in Twenty20 International history. Lee dismissed Shakib Al Hasan, Mashrafe Mortaza and Alok Kapali in consecutive balls to achieve this feat.
 Australian opening batsman Matthew Hayden was the top run scorer of the 2007 Twenty20 World Championship with 265 runs.
 Mitchell Johnson's figures of 5/26 against India in Vadodara were the best One Day International figures by an Australian in India.
 Michael Clarke made his Australian captaincy debut against New Zealand in the Twenty20 International match in Perth on 11 December 2007.
 On 25 January 2008, Adam Gilchrist broke Mark Boucher's world record of 413 for the most dismissals by a wicket-keeper in Test history, catching Anil Kumble off Mitchell Johnson.
 Veteran wicket-keeper Adam Gilchrist announced his retirement from all forms of cricket on 26 January 2008, effective at the conclusion of the Commonwealth Bank Series.
 On 29 January 2008 fast bowler Shaun Tait announced that he would quit cricket for an indefinite period of time due to physical and emotional exhaustion.
 On 26 February 2008 seamer Brett Lee won the Allan Border Medal for his outstanding bowling performance in 2007.
 On 27 February 2008 spinner Brad Hogg announced his retirement from all forms of cricket effective at the conclusion of the Commonwealth Bank Series.

See also

Pura Cup season 2007-08
KFC Twenty20 Big Bash season 2007-08
Australian One Day Domestic season 2007-08
International cricket in 2007–08

References

Australia in international cricket
2007–08 Australian cricket season